Xu Guangqin (born  in Heilongjiang) is a Chinese wheelchair curler.

She participated in the 2014 Winter Paralympics where Chinese team finished on fourth place.

Teams

References

External links 

Profile at the official website for the 2014 Winter Paralympics
 Video: 

Living people
1990 births
Sportspeople from Heilongjiang
Chinese female curlers
Chinese wheelchair curlers
Paralympic wheelchair curlers of China
Wheelchair curlers at the 2014 Winter Paralympics
21st-century Chinese women